HD 88809 is a star located in the southern constellation Antlia. With an apparent magnitude of 5.89 it is barely visible to the naked eye under ideal conditions. The star is located at a distance of around  but is drifting away at a heliocentric radial velocity of almost 20 km/s.

HD 88809 has a classification of K1 III which indicates that it is an evolved early K-type giant star that has exhausted hydrogen at its core and left the main sequence.

References

Antlia
088809
Double stars
K-type giants
4015
050103
Durchmusterung objects